Yalçın Koşukavak (born 14 October 1972) is a Turkish former association football player and current coach who most recently managed Süper Lig side Kayserispor. During his playing career he played as a goalkeeper.

Career
Koşukavak is a youth product of Altay, and spent his career as an semi-pro footballer with stints at Yeni Turgutluspor, Batman Petrolspor, Şanlıurfaspor, and Altınordu. 

After retiring, he went into football management. He was appointed the interim manager with Göztepe, and had stints with various clubs in the Turkish semi-pro divisions. He managed Karacabey Birlikspor, Altay, İstanbulspor, and Gaziantep before managing, and Denizlispor and Kayserispor in the Süper Lig in 2020 and 2021 respectively.

References

External links
 
 Yalçın Koşukavak at Soccerway
 Yalçın Koşukavak at Maçkolik

1972 births
Living people
Turkish footballers
Association football goalkeepers
Turgutluspor footballers
Batman Petrolspor footballers
Şanlıurfaspor footballers
Boluspor footballers
Göztepe S.K. managers
Altay S.K. managers
İstanbulspor managers
Gaziantep F.K. managers
Bursaspor managers
Denizlispor managers
Kayserispor managers
Süper Lig managers